PSPad editor is a freeware text editor and source editor intended for use by programmers. First released in 2001, this software is produced by a single Czech developer, Jan Fiala, for the Windows platform.

PSPad has many software development-oriented features, such as syntax highlighting and hex editing, and is designed as a universal GUI for editing many languages including PHP, Perl, HTML, and Java. It integrates the use of many project formats for handling and saving multiple files. PSPad also edits UTF-8 encoded texts. Other features include autocompletion, tabs, FTP client and find/replace using regular expressions. One of PSPad bright features is "File Difference" view. It shows three windows at a time. One window shows difference while two others show files itself. And these files can be edited. This is especially useful to manually resolve source file conflicts, fof example detected by SVN.

PSPad interface is based on the MDI with tabs for editing multiple files and better open document manipulation.

The software is packaged ready-to-run, so that no installer needs to be run, and it is semi-portable.

Reviews
Overall, reviewers seem to have responded well to PSPad editor. Softpedia rated the software with 5 stars, with a user feedback averaging 4.6 stars, and Download.com's user feedback for the software was 4.5 stars.

PC Pro's web site features an article comparing PSPad with multiple other text editors, praising PSPad for its multitude of features and its availability gratis. However, the review criticises PSPad's poor performance with larger files, instead favouring the shareware NoteTab Pro for those wanting a 'pure' text editor.

Well Done Software, however, is not so critical of the software, claiming that its programming features, while taking time to learn to use, give a worth-while advantage to work flow.

See also
List of text editors
Comparison of text editors

References

External links
PSPad Homepage
PSPad Forum

Windows-only freeware
Windows text editors
Freeware
Pascal (programming language) software